Endeavour station is a Via Rail flag stop in Endeavour, Saskatchewan, Canada. The station is served by Via Rail's Winnipeg–Churchill train.

Footnotes

External links 
Via Rail Station Information

Via Rail stations in Saskatchewan